All Systems Red is a 2017 science fiction novella by American author Martha Wells. The first in a series called The Murderbot Diaries, it was published by Tor.com. The series is about an artificial construct designed as a Security Unit, which manages to override its governor unit, thus enabling it to develop independence. It calls itself Murderbot, and likes to watch unrealistic soap operas. As it spends more time with some caring humans, it starts developing feelings that it does not care for.

Synopsis
A scientific expedition on an alien planet goes awry when one of its members is attacked by a giant native creature. She is saved by the expedition's SecUnit (Security Unit), a cyborg security agent which has secretly named itself "Murderbot". Though it has hacked the governor module that allows it to be controlled by humans, and would much rather be watching soap operas, the SecUnit has a vested interest in keeping its human clients safe and alive, since it has an especially grisly past expedition on its record. Murderbot soon discovers that information regarding hazardous fauna has been deleted from their survey packet of the planet. Further investigation reveals that some sections of their maps are missing as well. Meanwhile the PreservationAux survey team, led by Dr. Mensah, navigate their mixed feelings about the part machine, part human nature of their SecUnit. When they lose contact with the other known expedition, the DeltFall Group, Mensah leads a team to the opposite side of the planet to investigate. At the DeltFall habitat, Murderbot discovers that everyone there has been brutally murdered, and one of their three SecUnits destroyed. Murderbot disables the remaining two as they attack it, but is surprised when two others appear; it destroys one, and Mensah takes the other.

Murderbot is seriously injured, and realizes that one of the rogue SecUnits has installed a combat override module into its neck. The Preservation scientists are able to remove it before it completes the data upload that would put Murderbot under the control of whoever has command over the other SecUnits. The team discovers that Murderbot is autonomous, and once malfunctioned and murdered 57 people. The Preservation scientists mostly agree that, based on its protective behavior thus far, the SecUnit can be trusted. Remembering small incidents that now appear to be attempted sabotage, Murderbot and the group determine that there must be a third expedition, whose members are trying to eliminate DeltFall and Preservation for some reason. The Preservation scientists confirm that their HubSystem has been hacked, and flee their habitat before the mystery expedition they have dubbed "EvilSurvey" comes to kill them. The EvilSurvey team—GrayCris—leaves a message in the Preservation habitat inviting its scientists to meet at a rendezvous point to negotiate terms for their survival. Murderbot knows that GrayCris will never let them live, but the SecUnit has a plan. It makes an overture to GrayCris to negotiate for its own freedom, but this is a distraction while the Preservation scientists access the GrayCris HubSystem to activate their emergency beacon. The plan works, but Murderbot is injured protecting Mensah from the explosion of the launch. Later the SecUnit finds itself repaired, and retaining its memories and disabled governor module. Mensah has bought its contract, and will bring it back to Preservation's home base where it can live autonomously. Though grateful, Murderbot is reluctant to have its decisions made for it, and slips away on a cargo ship.

Reception
Publishers Weekly wrote that Wells "gives depth to a rousing but basically familiar action plot by turning it into the vehicle by which SecUnit engages with its own rigorously denied humanity". The Verge likewise felt it to be a "pretty basic story", but nonetheless "fun", and lauded Wells's worldbuilding. James Nicoll observed that the plot relies on "opportunistic corporate malevolence", and noted that only Murderbot's personality prevented the setting from being "unrelentingly grim".

All Systems Red won the 2018 Nebula Award for Best Novella, the 2018 Hugo Award for Best Novella, and the American Library Association's Alex Award, and was nominated for the 2017 Philip K. Dick Award.

References

External links
 

2017 American novels
2017 science fiction novels
American science fiction novels
Novels set on fictional planets
Tor Books books
Cyborgs in literature
Nebula Award for Best Novella-winning works
Hugo Award for Best Novella winning works